John B. Romar was the thirteenth Mayor of Jersey City. He succeeded Cornelius Van Vorst. Romar served from May 5, 1862 to May 1, 1864. He was succeeded by Orestes Cleveland.

Biography
Romar was known as Jersey City's "War Mayor" due to his actions to secure a $6 per month allowance to the family of every volunteer in the American Civil War. Romar personally collected and distributed these funds to the families of Jersey City while in office. In 1877, Romar ran for a seat on the Jersey City Board of Alderman, but was defeated by David W. Lawrence.

References

External links
 Jersey City Mayors

Mayors of Jersey City, New Jersey
Year of birth missing
Year of death missing